The 1994 European Mountain Running Trophy was held in Ponte nelle Alpi, Italy. It was the first European international competition for the sport and preceded the launching of an official European competition by the World Mountain Running Association the following year. It featured a men's race and a women's race, each of which had an individual and team component. The host nation Italy won all four titles, with Andrea Agostini and Nives Curti winning the individual races.

Results

Individual

Team

References

External links
 European Mountain Running Championships History at EAA

European Mountain Running Championships
Sport in Veneto
International athletics competitions hosted by Italy
European Mountain Running Championships
European Mountain Running Championships
1994 in Italian sport